In Ojibwe mythology, Mudjekeewis (from the Anishinaabe language majiikiwis "first-born son") is a spirit, and figures prominently in their storytelling, including the story of the world's creation. In their aadizookaanan (traditional stories), Majiikiwis is the first-born son of the E-bangishimog, the West Wind, and is cast as the guardian of tradition and ceremonies, symbolized by the bear.  

Of the medicinal plants, white cedar is associated with Majiikiwis.  He is the eldest brother to Nanabozho.

However, in The Song of Hiawatha based on the aadizookaanan, Mudjekeewis is portrayed instead as E-bangishimog himself, ravishing Wenonah and fathering Hiawatha. However, even in The Song of Hiawatha, Mudjekeewis is strongly associated with bears as demonstrated in the passage:

References
 Benton-Banai, Edward. The Mishomis Book: The Voice of the Ojibway. Hayward, WI: Indian Country Communications, 1988.
 Johnston, Basil. The Manitous: the spiritual world of the Ojibway. New York: HarperCollins Publishers, 1995.

External links
A site with information about Mudjekeewis
Another site with information about Mudjekeewis

Anishinaabe mythology